Reformed Esperanto, or Esperanto 1894, is a constructed language derived from Esperanto (i.e., an Esperantido), created by the original creator of Esperanto. It is notable as the only complete Esperantido by L. L. Zamenhof. Pressured to address proposed reforms after some six years (since 1887), the project was eventually rejected by the majority and even Zamenhof himself later. However, some of the proposed reforms were used in the language Ido, beginning in 1907, and live on in that language.

Background 
Although Zamenhof's stated preference was to avoid any discussion of changes, he was put under considerable pressure, including financial, to respond to the diverse reforms proposed by others. Reluctantly he decided to present a reformed dialect himself and undertook to continue guiding the community, whether or not reforms were eventually agreed upon.

Although Zamenhof initially called his reform a systematic attempt to re-create the language in the light of more than six years of practical experience, scarcely any of the Esperanto community of the time accepted it as a whole. The majority voted to reject all changes. Zamenhof himself later rejected the whole project and referred to 1894 as 'a wasted year'. In 1907 he expressly refused permission to anyone wishing to re-publish the proposed reforms. In 1929 Johannes Dietterle cited this refusal as justification for omitting details of the reform project from his collection of Zamenhof's complete works, Originala Verkaro.

Some of the proposed reforms from 1894 such as replacing the -oj plural with -i, the removal of the diacritics and adjectival agreement were used in the language reform project Ido beginning in 1907, but these were not accepted by the Esperanto community either and Esperanto has changed relatively little since the publication of Zamenhof's Fundamento de Esperanto in 1905.

Main proposed changes 

 The accented letters would disappear, together with most of their sounds.
 The letters "ĝ" and "ĵ" would be usually replaced by "g" and "j" respectively. 
 The definite article would be eliminated.
 The accusative would have the same form as the nominative and depend on position for clarity.
 A plural noun would replace "-o" with "-i", instead of adding "-j".
 Both adjectives and adverbs would take the ending "-e", be invariable, and depend on position for clarity.
 The number of participles would be reduced from six to two.
 The table of correlatives would be replaced with words or phrases taken from Romance languages.
 The roots of the language would be changed to reflect the new alphabet.
 The roots of the language not taken from Latin or Romance languages would be replaced by such.

Alphabet

Language samples for comparison 

The Lord's Prayer in several Reformed versions and standard Esperanto for comparison:

Sources 

 https://web.archive.org/web/20160304080500/https://www.scribd.com/doc/288010765/Pri-Reformoj-en-Esperanto  Pri Reformoj en Esperanto. Collection of the articles published by Zamenhof in 1894) 
 . The articles of L. Zamenhof 1894 from La Esperantista on archive.org. 
 https://sites.google.com/site/esperanto1894/  Overview and list of changes made in Esperanto1894, incl. Vortaro of roots.
 Antaŭen al la laboro! Plena Verkaro de Zamenhof, kajero 3. Kyoto: Ludovikito, 1974. 
 Washirei (2010). Esperanto 1894. Blogo por esperantologoj kaj ne nur!.  Retrieved January 8, 2011.

External links
 Esperanto 1894 at the Conlang Atlas of Language Structures.

Esperantido
International auxiliary languages
International auxiliary languages introduced in the 1890s